Ti Jeng (also Romanized as Tī Jeng) is a village in Derakhtengan Rural District, in the Central District of Kerman County, Kerman Province, Iran. At the 2006 census, its population was 11, in 4 families.

References 

Populated places in Kerman County